Carl of Sudermania - English also often: Charles ; Swedish Karl av Södermanland - as a ducal title may refer to:

Charles IX of Sweden, King of Sweden 1604–1611
Charles XIII of Sweden, King of Sweden 1809–1818 (and of Norway as Carl II)
Charles Philip, Duke of Södermanland, Prince of Sweden 1601
Prince Carl Oscar, Duke of Södermanland, Prince of Sweden and Norway 1852